Sumner County is a county located on the central northern border of the U.S. state of Tennessee, in what is called Middle Tennessee.

As of the 2020 census, the population was 196,281. Its county seat is Gallatin, and its largest city is Hendersonville. The county is named for American Revolutionary War hero General Jethro Sumner.

Sumner County is part of the Nashville-Davidson–Murfreesboro–Franklin, TN Metropolitan Statistical Area. The county is made up of eight cities, including Gallatin, Goodlettsville, Hendersonville, Millersville, Mitchellville, Portland, Westmoreland, and White House.

History

Prior to the European colonization of North America, the county had been inhabited by various cultures of Native Americans for several thousand years. Nomadic Paleo and Archaic hunter-gatherer campsites, as well as substantial Woodland and Mississippian-period occupation sites and burial grounds, can be found scattered throughout the county, particularly along the waterways. The majority of these sites exist along natural waterways, with the highest concentration occurring along what is now known as the Cumberland River. Mississippian period earthwork mounds can still be seen in Hendersonville, and most notably, at Castalian Springs. Long before Europeans entered the area, Native Americans made use of the natural hot springs for their medicinal and healing properties.

British colonial longhunters traveled into the area as early as the 1760s, following existing Indian and buffalo trails. By the early 1780s, they had erected several trading posts in the region. The most prominent was Mansker's Station, which was built by Kasper Mansker near a salt lick (where modern Goodlettsville would develop). Another was Bledsoe's Station, built by Isaac Bledsoe at Castilian Springs. Sumner County was organized in 1786, just 3 years after the end of the American Revolutionary War, when Tennessee was still the western part of North Carolina.

The county was developed for agriculture: tobacco and hemp, and blooded livestock. Numerous settlers came from central Kentucky's Bluegrass Region, where these were the most important products. Middle Tennessee had fertile lands that could be used for similar crops and supported high-quality livestock as well. The larger planters depended on the labor of enslaved African Americans, but Middle Tennessee had a lower proportion of slaves in the population than in West Tennessee, the plantation area of Memphis and the Delta, where cotton was cultivated.

During the American Civil War, most of Tennessee was occupied by Union troops from 1862. This led to a breakdown in civil order in many areas. The Union commander, Eleazer A. Paine, was based at Gallatin, the county seat. He was notoriously cruel and had suspected spies publicly executed without trial in the town square. He was eventually replaced  because of his mistreatment of the people.

In 1873 the county was hit hard by the fourth cholera pandemic of the century, which had begun about 1863 in Asia. It eventually reached North America and was spread by steamboat passengers who traveled throughout the waterways, especially in the South on the Mississippi River and its tributaries. An estimated 120 persons died of cholera in Sumner County in 1873, mostly during the summer. The disease was spread mainly through contaminated water, due to the lack of sanitation. About four-fifths of the county's victims were African Americans. Many families, both black and white, lost multiple members. In the United States overall, about 50,000 persons died of cholera in the 1870s.

Geography

Sumner County is located in Middle Tennessee on the state's northern border with Kentucky. The Cumberland River was important in early trade and transportation for this area, as it flows into the Ohio River to the west. That leads to the Mississippi River, and downriver to the major port of New Orleans. Sumner County is in the Greater Nashville metropolitan area.

Adjacent counties
 Davidson County (southwest)
 Macon County (east)
 Robertson County (west)
 Trousdale County (southeast)
 Wilson County (south)
 Allen County, Kentucky (northeast)
 Simpson County, Kentucky (northwest)

State protected areas
 Bledsoe Creek State Park
 Cragfont State Historic Site
 Gallatin Steam Plant Wildlife Management Area
 Old Hickory Lock and Dam Wildlife Management Area (part)
 Rock Castle State Historic Site
 Taylor Hollow State Natural Area
 Wynnewood State Historic Site

Highways

Demographics

2020 census

As of the 2020 United States census, there were 196,281 people, 70,098 households, and 51,272 families residing in the county.

2010 census
As of the census of 2010, there were 160,645 people, 60,975 households, and 44,593 families living in the county. The population density was 303.68 persons per square mile. The housing unit density was 115.26 units per square mile. The racial makeup of the county was 89.67% White, 6.42% African American, 1.02% Asian, 0.29% Native American, 0.07% Pacific Islander, and 1.45% from two or more races. Those of Hispanic or Latino origins constituted 3.93% of the population.

Out of all of the households, 26.08% had children under the age of 18 living in them, 57.05% were married couples, 4.37% had a male householder with no wife present, 11.72% had a female householder with no husband present, and 26.87% were non-families. 22.07% of all householders were made up of individuals, and 8.29% were one person aged 65 or older. The average household size was 2.61 and the average family size was 3.05.

The age distribution was 25.29% under the age of 18, 62.10% ages 18 to 64, and 12.61% ages 65 and over. The median age was 38.6 years. 51.20% of the population were females, and 48.80% were males.

The median household income in the county was $54,916, and the median family income was $65,313. Males had a median income of $46,606, versus $35,256 for females. The per capita income was $26,014. About 7.3% of families and 10.1% of the population were below the poverty line, including 13.9% of those under the age of 18 and 9.4% of those age 65 and over.

2000 census
At the 2000 census there were 130,449 people, 48,941 households, and 37,048 families living in the county.  The population density was 246 people per square mile (95/km2).  There were 51,657 housing units at an average density of 98 per square mile (38/km2).  The racial makeup of the county was 91.49% White, 5.78% Black or African American, 0.29% Native American, 0.66% Asian, 0.03% Pacific Islander, 0.80% from other races, and 0.96% from two or more races.  1.76% of the population were Hispanic or Latino of any race.
In 2000 Of the 48,941 households 36.30% had children under the age of 18 living with them, 61.10% were married couples living together, 10.80% had a female householder with no husband present, and 24.30% were non-families. 20.30% of households were one person and 7.20% were one person aged 65 or older.  The average household size was 2.64 and the average family size was 3.04.

The age distribution was 26.30% under the age of 18, 8.00% from 18 to 24, 30.70% from 25 to 44, 24.30% from 45 to 64, and 10.70% 65 or older.  The median age was 36 years. For every 100 females, there were 95.90 males.  For every 100 females age 18 and over, there were 92.30 males.

The median household income was $46,030 and the median family income  was $52,125. Males had a median income of $36,875 versus $25,720 for females. The per capita income for the county was $21,164.  About 6.20% of families and 8.10% of the population were below the poverty line, including 10.50% of those under age 18 and 10.00% of those age 65 or over.

Education

Public schools

Schools in the county are governed by the Sumner County Board of Education. The twelve-member group consists of eleven elected representatives from each of the eleven educational districts in the county, as well as the Director of Schools. The members serve staggered four-year terms; the Director serves under contract with the Board of Education. The board conducts monthly meetings that are open to the public.

Private schools
 Saint John Vianney Catholic Elementary School (K–8)
 Sumner Academy (K–8)
 John Paul II High School
 Aaron Academy (K-12)
 Hendersonville Christian Academy (PK-12)
 Restoring Hope Christian Academy (PK-12)

Colleges
 Volunteer State Community College
 Union University (Hendersonville Campus)
 Welch College

Communities

Cities
 Gallatin (county seat)
 Goodlettsville (partly in Davidson County)
 Hendersonville
 Millersville (partly in Robertson County)
 Mitchellville
 Portland (partly in Robertson County)
 White House (small part in Robertson County)

Town
 Westmoreland

Census-designated places

 Bethpage
 Bransford
 Castalian Springs
 Cottontown
 Fairfield
 Graball
 New Deal
 Oak Grove
 Shackle Island
 Walnut Grove

Unincorporated communities
 Bon Air
 Brackentown
 Cairo
 Corinth

Notable people
Submarine innovator Horace Lawson Hunley was born in Sumner County on June 20, 1823. On October 15, 1863, Hunley, along with seven other crewmen, drowned while making a test dive in Charleston Harbor near Fort Pinckney. Following his death, the submarine, unofficially known as the "Fish Boat," was renamed the H.L. Hunley in his honor.

Watergate prosecutor and criminal defense trial lawyer James F. Neal was born and raised in Oak Grove and graduated from Sumner High School in Portland in 1947.

R&B National Recording Artist Nacole Rice was born in Sumner County.

Politics

Though part of historically Democratic Middle Tennessee, Sumner County was one of the first counties in the region to switch to the Republican Party. It has voted for the GOP solidly in every election back to 1984, with the sole exception being Bill Clinton's victory in the county in 1992.

See also
 National Register of Historic Places listings in Sumner County, Tennessee

References

Further reading

External links

 Official site
 Sumner County Schools
 TNGenWeb
 Tennessee Central Economic Alliance for Sumner County
 

 
1786 establishments in North Carolina
Nashville metropolitan area
Populated places established in 1786
Middle Tennessee